Franklin Tunnel is a railway tunnel near Martinez, California. It carries the BNSF Railway Stockton Subdivision under the Briones Hills between Glen Frazer and the railroad's approach to the San Francisco Bay. It was built by the San Francisco and San Joaquin Valley Railroad just prior to the company's acquisition by the Atchison, Topeka and Santa Fe Railway. It opened for service in 1900 as the company's longest tunnel.

The tunnel was closed for several weeks in early 1907 as a persistent fire ate away at the supporting timbers, causing a cave-in.

References

External links
Franklin Tunnel, East Portal – early 1900s photo via the Contra Costa County Historical Society

BNSF Railway tunnels
Railroad tunnels in California
Transportation buildings and structures in Contra Costa County, California
Tunnels completed in 1900
Tunnels in the San Francisco Bay Area